This is a list of the operas written by the Italian composer Tommaso Traetta (1727–1779).

Traetta wrote 25 opere serie, 5 opere buffe, 4 drammi giocosi, 2 azioni teatrali and 1 each of the following: azione drammatica, burletta, dramma eroicomico, pastorale, semiseria e bernesca, serenata, and tragedia.

List

References

Heartz, Daniel and McClymonds, Marita P (1992), 'Traetta, Tommaso' in The New Grove Dictionary of Opera, ed. Stanley Sadie (London) 

 
Lists of operas by composer
Lists of compositions by composer